Todoroki Station is the name of two train stations in Japan:

 Todoroki Station (Aomori) (驫木駅) in Fukaura Town, Aomori Prefecture
 Todoroki Station (Tokyo) (等々力駅) in Tokyo